The Conservative Party was a Brazilian political party of the imperial period, which was formed c. 1836 and ended with the proclamation of the Republic in 1889. This party arose mostly from a dissident wing of the Moderate Party (Partido Moderado) and from some of the members of the Restorationist Party (Partido Restaurador) in the 1830s when it became known as the Reactionary Party (Partido Regressista).  In the early 1840s it called itself the Party of Order to distinguish itself from the liberal opposition, which they accused of disorder and anarchy, and both the party members and its leadership were known as "saquaremas" after the village of Saquarema, where the leadership had plantations and support. Later, in the middle 1850s it was finally known as the Conservative Party.

References

Bibliography
Ilmar Rohloff de Mattos, O tempo saquarema: A formação do estado imperial (Rio de Janeiro: ACCESS, 1994); emphasizes party's role in promoting antidemocratic hierarchies of wealth and authority
 Emphasizes party's defense of stability and parliamentary rule.

External links

Conservative parties in Brazil
Defunct political parties in Brazil
1836 establishments in Brazil
Political parties established in 1836
1889 disestablishments in Brazil
Political parties disestablished in 1889